Rafi Bistritzer (born 1974 in Israel) is an Israeli physicist, and manager of an algorithms group at Applied Materials. He is the winner of the 2020 Wolf Prize in Physics, together with Pablo Jarillo-Herrero and Alan MacDonald, for “pioneering theoretical and experimental work on twisted bilayer graphene.”

Biography
Bistritzer received a bachelor's degree in physics from Tel Aviv University in 2000. He received an MSc in physics in 2003, and a PhD in physics in 2007, both from the Weizmann Institute of Science. He moved to the United States for a postdoctoral fellowship at the University of Texas at Austin, under the supervision of Prof. Alan MacDonald, where he studied the theoretical physics of bilayer graphene, and specifically twisted bilayer graphene. Their calculations predicted that two parallel graphene sheets twisted at an angle of 1.1 degrees relative to each other (an angle known as the "magic angle") would host flat moiré bands and thus possibly correlated states.

MacDonald's and Bistritzer's work served as the basis for later experimental research by Pablo Jarillo-Herrero at MIT, whose group validated the correctness of the calculations in 2018. The result was a breakthrough in the field of twistronics. For their work, Bistritzer, MacDonald, and Jarillo-Herrero were jointly awarded the 2020 Wolf Prize in physics.

In March 2011 Bistritzer returned to Israel and joined Aspect Imaging, where he worked as a physicist and led a research and development rheology team. In 2013 he moved to Medtronic as the manager of the physics group. Since December 2015, he has been working at Applied Materials as the director of an algorithms group that focuses on computer vision and machine learning. In 2020 he was appointed as an associate professor in Tel Aviv University.

Bistritzer currently lives in Petah Tikva, Israel.

References

External links
 The Wolf 2020 Prize in Physics - Rafi Bistritzer.
 Google scholar - Rafi Bistritzer.

1974 births
Israeli physicists
Living people
Wolf Prize in Physics laureates
Tel Aviv University alumni
Weizmann Institute of Science alumni
University of Texas at Austin people
People from Petah Tikva